"B.S." is a single recorded by American singer Jhené Aiko featuring fellow American singer H.E.R., released on March 6, 2020 as a single from the former's third studio album Chilombo (2020). The song was written by the artists alongside Big Sean and producers the Fisticuffs (Brian Warfield and Mac Robinson). An animated music video for the song premiered in May 2020. A remix of the song featuring Kehlani, was included on the deluxe edition of Chilombo, which was released on July 17, 2020. The vinyl version of the remix features an originally intended verse by Kehlani.

The song became Aiko's second top-forty entry on the US Billboard Hot 100 and her highest-charting song in New Zealand and the UK, following the album's release. "B.S." became the fourth consecutive release from Chilombo to receive gold certification by RIAA in May 2020, for selling 500,000 units. It was certified platinum in September 2020. "B.S." went on to top rhythmic radio in December 2020.

Commercial performance 
"B.S." attained commercial success for both Aiko and Wilson. By entering and peaking at number twenty-four on Billboard Hot 100 for the week of March 21, 2020, the song is to date the highest charting release for both singers, with Aiko earning her second top-forty entry as a lead artist on the chart, additionally. Moreover, the song was the fifth consecutive top-ten entry from Chilombo on the component Billboard R&B Songs chart, peaking at number five. The song was eventually certified gold by RIAA on May 13, 2020, almost two months after its release. It was also Aiko's highest charting song on the New Zealand Hot Singles and UK Singles Chart, peaking at number fifteen and sixty-four, respectively.

Charts

Weekly charts

Year-end charts

Certifications

References

External links

2020 songs
Jhené Aiko songs
H.E.R. songs
Kehlani songs
Songs written by Jhené Aiko
Songs written by H.E.R.
Songs written by Big Sean
Animated music videos
Def Jam Recordings singles